Tower Hill Park marks the northern boundary of Prospect Park, a hilly residential neighborhood in southeast Minneapolis. The 4.7-acre city park is bounded on the northeast by University Avenue, the east by Clarence Avenue, the south by Seymour Avenue, the southwest by Orlin Avenue, and the northwest by Malcolm Avenue. With the exception of University Avenue, quiet, residential streets surround Tower Hill Park.

Standing at nearly 1,000 feet above sea level, the Prospect Park Water Tower has the distinction of occupying one of the highest spots in the Twin Cities.  With its thick concrete shaft, open-air belvedere, and steeply pitched, green-tile roof, the water tower looms over a small pump house on the northwest edge of the park, a set of tennis courts on the southwest side of the park, and the curvilinear streets of the adjacent neighborhood. Much of the upper portion of Tower Hill Park is heavily wooded, gradually giving way to a grass lawn as the elevation lowers.

References

Parks in Minneapolis